Sekonaia Tu'akoi (1912 – October 1982) was a Tongan policeman, lawyer and politician. He served as a member of the Legislative Assembly from 1951 until 1972.

Biography
After studying at Tupou College and Tonga College, Tu'akoi joined the police as a constable in 1933. He was promoted to sergeant major, before leaving the police to become a lawyer in 1947.

In 1951 he was elected to the Legislative Assembly from the Tongatapu constituency. He was subsequently re-elected in 1954, 1957, 1960, 1963, 1966 and 1969. In 1971 he was appointed a police magistrate.

He died in October 1982 at the age of 70.

References

1912 births
Tongan police officers
Tongan lawyers
Members of the Legislative Assembly of Tonga
Tongan judges
1982 deaths
20th-century lawyers